Darrion Scott (born October 25, 1981) is a former American football defensive end. He was drafted by the Minnesota Vikings in the third round of the 2004 NFL Draft. He played college football at Ohio State University.

Scott has also played for the Florida Tuskers and Washington Redskins.

College career
Scott attended and played college football at Ohio State University.  As a junior, he was named first-team All-Big Ten by conference coaches and was a member of the Ohio State Buckeyes team that won the 2002 BCS National Championship Game.

Professional career

Minnesota Vikings
Scott was drafted by the Minnesota Vikings in the third round of the 2004 NFL Draft. After spending a season as a backup he became a full-time starter in 2005. He led the team in sacks 2006 with 5.5. In 2007, he played in only four games due to an injury.

Washington Redskins
On April 27, 2010, Scott signed a contract with the Washington Redskins. He saw the Redskins' organization particularly appealing because Jim Haslett, his UFL coach, is the team's new defensive coordinator. He was waived on November 8, 2011 but re-signed on November 15, 2011.

Originally scheduled to be an unrestricted free agent in the 2012 season, Scott re-signed with the Redskins on February 27, 2012. He was released by the Redskins on August 31, 2012 for final cuts before the start of the season.

Legal troubles
Scott was arrested on December 26, 2007 after officers discovered a small amount of marijuana in his Chevrolet Tahoe. He was booked by Charleston police officers on misdemeanor marijuana possession charges.

Scott was arrested again on April 30, 2008 for suspicion of assault and malicious punishment of a child. Scott faced two felony charges and one misdemeanor charge. The boy's mother allegedly found Scott holding a dry cleaning bag over the child's head. Scott told police the two were playing a game with the bag, and Scott wanted to see if the boy could get the bag off his head by himself. He pleaded guilty to child endangerment and was sentenced July 24, 2008. The NFL suspended Scott three games for violating the league's conduct policy.

References

External links
Washington Redskins bio
Just Sports Stats

1981 births
Living people
Sportspeople from Charleston, West Virginia
Players of American football from West Virginia
American football defensive ends
Ohio State Buckeyes football players
Minnesota Vikings players
Florida Tuskers players
Washington Redskins players